Pneumococcal meningitis cases were recorded in Ghana in the last quarter of 2015 and an outbreak confirmed by the ministry of health was reported in January 2016. On January 26, 2016, it was reported that 153 people had become infected and 32 had died.

External links 
Propagated Pneumococcal Meningitis Outbreak

Pneumococcal meningitis outbreak

References

Disease outbreaks in Ghana
2016 in Ghana
Meningitis
2016 disasters in Ghana